A tessera is an individual tile in a mosaic.

Tessera, plural tesserae, may also refer to: 
 the number 4 in Greek (τέσσερα)
 dice used in ancient Rome
 the booklet of prayers of the Legion of Mary, a Catholic lay organization
 layers of calcification on sharks' otherwise cartilaginous jaws and backbones
 a frazione of the comune of Venice nearest to Mestre
 Venice-Tessera Airport
 Tessera (commerce), a token or tally in ancient and medieval times
 Tessera (Venusian geography), large regions of highly deformed terrain, possibly unique to Venus
 Tesserae (video game), a puzzle game for Macintosh computers
 Tessera, the codename for the original iMac G4
 Tessera Technologies, an international microelectronics company

See also
Tesseract

fr:Tessère